General elections to the Cortes Generales were held in Spain in November 1837. At stake were all 241 seats in the Congress of Deputies.

Electoral system

Voting rights
Restricted census suffrage, only 262,000 people out of a total population of 12,162,872 were allowed to vote. The elections were held on 22 September, at the peak of the First Carlist War.

Constituencies
A majority voting system was used for the election, with 51 multi-member constituencies and 1 single-member constituency. Voting was secret and direct.

Results

References

 Estadísticas históricas de España: siglos XIX-XX.

1837
November 1837 events